Karen Busck (born 5 January 1975) is a Danish singer and songwriter who debuted with the album Hjertet ser in 2001, sung with Erann DD. She has been a judge on the Danish reality TV-contest Stjerne for en aften in 2003. She has a degree as a teacher of music from the Royal Academy of Music, Aarhus/Aalborg.

Discography 
 Hjertet ser (2001)
 By (2003)
 En kærlighedsaffære (2008)

References

External links 

 

1975 births
Singers from Aarhus
Danish songwriters
21st-century Danish women singers
Living people